North Shore Academy or Northshore Academy may refer to:

Northshore Academy, Beverly, an alternative high school in Beverly, Massachusetts, United States
North Shore Academy, Stockton-on-Tees, a secondary school in Stockton-on-Tees, England
Northshore Christian Academy, a private elementary and middle school in Everett, Washington, United States

See also
North Shore (disambiguation)